The California Oil Exchange was a regional stock exchange in California. It opened in San Francisco on October 18, 1899, with a "large attendance" and 22 listed stocks. The stocks were from the oil districts of Los Angeles, Santa Barbara, and Fresno. Shares sold on the first day included St. Lawrence, San Joaquin, Northfield, Quitable, Big Panoche, Kings County, 100 Eagle, and 200 Stella. It was absorbed by the Los Angeles Stock Exchange in September 1900, when 51 members relinquished their membership in the California Oil Exchange in favor of membership in the other.

See also
 
List of former stock exchanges in the Americas   
List of stock exchange mergers in the Americas
Pacific Exchange

References

Former stock exchanges in the United States
Economy of San Francisco